Sunil Kariattukara is a filmmaker from Kerala.

Career 
Sunil started his career with theatre in the early 1990s. He worked with Jain Joseph, K. Gireesh Kumar, Prem Prakash, K.V Ganesh at that period. He directed a few plays and later associated to Root Theatre, Thrissur which was led by Jose Chiramel.

His passion towards visual arts moved him to cinema in late 1990s, started as an assistant director.

In the 2000s he was associate director to Rosshan Andrrews, B. Unnikrishnan, Priyanandanan, Salim Ahamed etc. in their most successful projects.

His debut film, Chacko Randaaman released in 2006. Actor Kalabhavan Mani performed three different characters in the film. Second film Pakida released in 2014 starring Biju Menon, Asif Ali.

Filmography

Television serials

References 

Malayalam film directors
Film directors from Kerala